Micrococcal nuclease (S7 Nuclease, MNase, spleen endonuclease, thermonuclease, nuclease T, micrococcal endonuclease, nuclease T''', staphylococcal nuclease, spleen phosphodiesterase, Staphylococcus aureus nuclease, Staphylococcus aureus nuclease B, ribonucleate (deoxynucleate) 3'-nucleotidohydrolase) is an endo-exonuclease that preferentially digests single-stranded nucleic acids. The rate of cleavage is 30 times greater at the 5' side of A or T than at G or C and results in the production of mononucleotides and oligonucleotides with terminal 3'-phosphates. The enzyme is also active against double-stranded DNA and RNA and all sequences will be ultimately cleaved.

Characteristics

The enzyme has a molecular weight of 16.9kDa.

The pH optimum is reported as 9.2. The enzyme activity is strictly dependent on Ca2+ and the pH optimum varies according to Ca2+ concentration. The enzyme is therefore easily inactivated by EGTA.

Sources

This enzyme is the extracellular nuclease of Staphylococcus aureus. Two strains, V8 and Foggi, yield almost identical enzymes. A common source is E.coli'' cells carrying a cloned nuc gene encoding Staphylococcus aureus extracellular nuclease (micrococcal nuclease).

Structure
The 3-dimensional structure of micrococcal nuclease (then called Staphyloccal nuclease) was solved very early in the history of protein crystallography, in 1969, deposited as now-obsolete Protein Data Bank file 1SNS. Higher-resolution, more recent crystal structures are available for the apo form as Protein Data Bank file 1SNO:  and for the thymidine-diphosphate-inhibited form as Protein Data Bank file 3H6M:  or 1SNC: . As seen in the ribbon diagram above, the nuclease molecule has 3 long alpha helices and a 5-stranded, barrel-shaped beta sheet, in an arrangement known as the OB-fold (for oligonucleotide-binding fold) as classified in the SCOP database.

Applications
CUT&RUN sequencing, antibody-targeted controlled cleavage by micrococcal nuclease for transcriptomic profiling.
Hydrolysis of nucleic acids in crude cell-free extracts.
Sequencing of RNA.
Preparation of rabbit reticulocyte lysates.
Studies of chromatin structure.
Removal of nucleic acids from laboratory protein preparations allowing for protein folding and structure-function studies.
Research on the mechanisms of protein folding.

References

http://www.thermoscientificbio.com/dna-and-rna-modifying-enzymes/micrococcal-nuclease/
http://www.worthington-biochem.com/NFCP/default.html
http://www.thermoscientificbio.com/uploadedFiles/Resources/en0181-usa-msds.pdf - A material and safety data sheet for the product
http://www.thermoscientificbio.com/uploadedFiles/Resources/en018-product-information.pdf - A Product Information sheet

External links
 
 

Proteins
Molecular biology
EC 3.1.31